Adrián Rivera Pérez (born 8 July 1962) is a Mexican politician affiliated with the PAN. As of 2013 he served as Senator of the LX and LXI Legislatures of the Mexican Congress representing Morelos. He also served as Deputy during the LVIII Legislature. He was Presidente Municipal (mayor) of Cuernavaca from 2003 to 2006.

References

1962 births
Living people
Politicians from Mexico City
Members of the Senate of the Republic (Mexico)
Members of the Chamber of Deputies (Mexico)
National Action Party (Mexico) politicians
20th-century Mexican politicians
21st-century Mexican politicians
Municipal presidents in Morelos
Members of the Congress of Morelos
Universidad Autónoma del Estado de Morelos alumni